Saint Abran (Breton for 'Abraham'), was a 6th-century Irish hermit in Brittany.

Life
Abran was born in Ireland and was a brother of Gibrian. Abran and Gibrain  traveled to Brittany with their siblings. The five brothers and three sisters chose a life of devotion to God in consecrated religious life. Abran lived in a hermitage on the Marne River, which had been given to him by Saint Remigius.

Abran and his siblings are all considered saints for their positive Christian influence upon the Breton people.

Saint Abran's feast day is 8 May on the Western Rite Orthodox and Roman Catholic Church calendars.

See also 
Christian monasticism
Desert Fathers
Julien Maunoir, apostle of Brittany

References

Sources
 Catholic Online
 Latin Saints of the Orthodox Patriarchate of Rome

Further reading

Medieval Irish saints on the Continent
Medieval Breton saints
6th-century deaths
6th-century Irish people
6th-century Christian saints
Year of birth unknown
6th-century Breton people